The 1925 Tasmanian state election was held on 3 June 1925. Since the last election, the Nationalist Party had split, with some supporting former leader Sir Walter Lee's "Liberal" grouping. The Tasmanian branch of the Country Party had also ceased to exist, with its members scattering to the Nationalists, Liberals or independents.

Retiring Members

Nationalist
These members were elected in 1922 as members of the Nationalist or Country parties; their designation for 1925 (Nationalist, Liberal or Independent) is not clear.
Richard Franks MHA (Darwin)
Alexander Hean MHA (Franklin)

House of Assembly
Sitting members are shown in bold text. Tickets that elected at least one MHA are highlighted in the relevant colour. Successful candidates are indicated by an asterisk (*).

Bass
Six seats were up for election. The Labor Party was defending three seats. The Nationalist Party was defending three seats, although one sitting member ran as a Liberal and another as an independent. Independent Labor MHA Jens Jensen was defending one seat.

Darwin
Six seats were up for election. The Labor Party was defending three seats. The Nationalist Party was defending three seats, two of which had been won by the Country Party at the last election.

Denison
Six seats were up for election. The Labor Party was defending three seats. The Nationalist Party was defending three seats.

Franklin
Six seats were up for election. The Labor Party was defending two seats. The Nationalist Party was defending three seats, although Nationalist MHA Peter Murdoch was running as an independent. Country Party MHA John Piggott was also running as an independent.

Wilmot
Six seats were up for election. The Labor Party was defending two seats. The Nationalist Party was defending four seats, two of which had been held by the Country Party.

See also
 Members of the Tasmanian House of Assembly, 1922–1925
 Members of the Tasmanian House of Assembly, 1925–1928

References
Tasmanian Parliamentary Library

Candidates for Tasmanian state elections